Thomas William Brelsford (21 April 1894–1946) was an English footballer who played in the Football League for Barrow, Rotherham United and The Wednesday.

References

1894 births
1946 deaths
English footballers
Association football midfielders
English Football League players
Wombwell F.C. players
Castleford Town F.C. players
Sheffield Wednesday F.C. players
Barrow A.F.C. players
Rotherham United F.C. players